Normania is an unincorporated community in Normania Township, Yellow Medicine County, Minnesota, United States.

Notes

Unincorporated communities in Yellow Medicine County, Minnesota
Unincorporated communities in Minnesota